Hidayet "Hedo" Türkoğlu (born March 19, 1979) is a Turkish basketball executive and former professional player. A  forward, Türkoğlu played for six teams in his 15-season career in the National Basketball Association (NBA). He won the NBA's Most Improved Player for the 2007–08 NBA season and played in the NBA Finals for the Magic in 2009. He also played for Turkey's national team in international competition. Türkoğlu has served as president of the Turkish Basketball Federation since October 2016.

Professional career

Efes Pilsen (1996–2000)
Türkoğlu joined Efes Pilsen (now known as Anadolu Efes) in 1996 and played four seasons with the team. He averaged 8.4 points on 58 percent shooting in 50 games in the EuroLeague. Türkoğlu helped the team reach the 2000 EuroLeague Final Four, averaging 13.6 points, 4.6 rebounds, and 2.7 assists, in 22 games.

Sacramento Kings (2000–2003)
Türkoğlu was selected by the Sacramento Kings with the 16th pick of the 2000 NBA draft. He was the first Turkish-born player in NBA history. He played alongside other European stars such as Vlade Divac and Peja Stojaković.

Turkoglu received votes for the NBA Sixth Man of the Year Award following the 2001–02 season, when he averaged 10.1 points and 4.5 rebounds per game.

San Antonio Spurs (2003–2004)
During the 2003 offseason, Türkoğlu was traded to the San Antonio Spurs along with Ron Mercer in a three-team trade. The trade also sent Brad Miller to the Kings and Scot Pollard and Danny Ferry to the Pacers. Türkoğlu played one season with the Spurs and averaged 9.2 points on a career-high 42 percent three-point shooting.

Orlando Magic (2004–2009)

Türkoğlu joined the Orlando Magic in 2004. He scored a career-high 39 points twice: in an April 2007 game against the Toronto Raptors, and in a March 2008 game against the Washington Wizards.

On April 28, 2008, Türkoğlu was named the NBA's Most Improved Player for the 2007–08 NBA season. The Magic won 52 games that season, and Türkoğlu averaged career-highs in points per game (19.5), rebounds per game (5.7), and assists per game (5.0) and started all 82 regular-season games.

In the 2008–09 NBA season, Türkoğlu helped the Magic reach the NBA Finals for the first time since 1995. He led the Magic with 18.0 points per game in the Finals. However, they lost in five games to the Los Angeles Lakers. Türkoğlu decided to opt out of his contract after the season.

Toronto Raptors (2009–2010)

On July 9, 2009, Türkoğlu was signed and traded to the Toronto Raptors as a part of a four-team deal among the Toronto Raptors, Orlando Magic, Dallas Mavericks and Memphis Grizzlies, which also included Shawn Marion.

On March 28, 2010, Türkoğlu was a healthy scratch for the Raptors, his first benching since March 10, 2006, when he was still an Orlando Magic player. This was a disciplinary measure, after he was spotted by fans out late in a nightclub in the Yorkville district of Toronto, immediately after missing a game due to a stomach virus. The fans wrote staff within the Raptors organization, who then notified management and coaching staff, leading to the punishment.

On May 29, 2010, Türkoğlu said in a television interview in Turkey that he felt he was wronged by the Raptors' management and wanted to leave Toronto.

Phoenix Suns (2010)
On July 14, 2010, he was traded to the Phoenix Suns for Leandro Barbosa and Dwayne Jones.

Return to Orlando (2010–2014)
On December 18, 2010, Türkoğlu was traded back to the Orlando Magic along with Jason Richardson and Earl Clark for Vince Carter, Marcin Gortat, Mickaël Piétrus, a 2011 first-round draft pick, and $3 million cash. On February 13, 2013, Türkoğlu was suspended for 20 games after testing positive for methenolone. Türkoğlu said that he received medicine containing methenolone from a trainer in Turkey, though he did not know it was a banned substance.

On January 3, 2014, Türkoğlu was waived by the Magic. He did not appear for them in the 2013–14 season.

Los Angeles Clippers (2014–2015)
On January 16, 2014, Türkoğlu signed with the Los Angeles Clippers for the rest of the 2013–14 season. On January 18, he made his Clippers debut. In 13 minutes he recorded 4 points, 2 rebounds and 1 assist in a 92–106 loss to the Indiana Pacers.

On September 12, 2014, he re-signed with the Clippers.

International career

Türkoğlu was a member of the Turkish national team which won a silver medal at EuroBasket 2001. He averaged 15.5 points per game in the tournament.

Türkoğlu was named to the preliminary roster for the 2006 World Championship. However, he declined the invitation.

In 2009, Türkoğlu was a member of the Turkish national team which finished in eighth place at the EuroBasket in Poland. One year later, Turkoglu participated in the 2010 FIBA World Championship, in his home country of Turkey. The Turkish national team finished with the silver medal, having beaten every team except for Team USA, the champions. Türkoğlu averaged 12.3 points, 4.2 rebounds, and 3.4 assists per game. At the 2011 EuroBasket, and the 2013 EuroBasket, he averaged 10.6 and 7.3 points per game, respectively.

In March 2014, Türkoğlu retired from international basketball.

NBA career statistics

Regular season

|-
| style="text-align:left;"| 
| style="text-align:left;"| Sacramento
| 74 || 7 || 16.8 || .412 || .326 || .777 || 2.8 || .9 || .7 || .3 || 5.3
|-
| style="text-align:left;"| 
| style="text-align:left;"| Sacramento
| 80 || 10 || 24.6 || .422 || .368 || .726 || 4.5 || 2.0 || .7 || .4 || 10.1
|-
| style="text-align:left;"| 
| style="text-align:left;"| Sacramento
| 67 || 11 || 17.5 || .422 || .372 || .800 || 2.8 || 1.3 || .4 || .2 || 6.7
|-
| style="text-align:left;"| 
| style="text-align:left;"| San Antonio
| 80 || 44 || 25.9 || .406 || .419 || .708 || 4.5 || 1.9 || 1.0 || .4 || 9.2
|-
| style="text-align:left;"| 
| style="text-align:left;"| Orlando
| 67 || 11 || 26.2 || .419 || .380 || .836 || 3.5 || 2.3 || .6 || .3 || 14.0
|-
| style="text-align:left;"| 
| style="text-align:left;"| Orlando
| 78 || 59 || 33.5 || .454 || .403 || .861 || 4.3 || 2.8 || .9 || .3 || 14.9
|-
| style="text-align:left;"| 
| style="text-align:left;"| Orlando
| 73 || 73 || 31.1 || .419 || .388 || .781 || 4.0 || 3.2 || 1.0 || .2 || 13.3
|-
| style="text-align:left;"| 
| style="text-align:left;"| Orlando
| 82 || 82 || 36.9 || .456 || .400 || .829 || 5.7 || 5.0 || .9 || .3 || 19.5
|-
| style="text-align:left;"| 
| style="text-align:left;"| Orlando
| 77 || 77 || 36.6 || .413 || .356 || .807 || 5.3 || 4.9 || .8 || .2 || 16.8
|-
| style="text-align:left;"| 
| style="text-align:left;"| Toronto
| 74 || 69 || 30.7 || .409 || .374 || .774 || 4.6 || 4.1 || .7 || .4 || 11.3
|-
| style="text-align:left;"| 
| style="text-align:left;"| Phoenix
| 25 || 16 || 25.2 || .440 || .423 || .722 || 4.0 || 2.3 || .7 || .6 || 9.5
|-
| style="text-align:left;"| 
| style="text-align:left;"| Orlando
| 56 || 56 || 33.9 || .448 || .404 || .667 || 4.6 || 5.1 || .9 || .4 || 11.4
|-
| style="text-align:left;"| 
| style="text-align:left;"| Orlando
| 53 || 53 || 31.2 || .415 || .353 || .705 || 3.8 || 4.4 || .8 || .3 || 10.9
|-
| style="text-align:left;"| 
| style="text-align:left;"| Orlando
| 11 || 1 || 17.2 || .264 || .042 || .500 || 2.4 || 2.1 || .6 || .1 || 2.9
|-
| style="text-align:left;"| 
| style="text-align:left;"| L.A. Clippers
| 38 || 0 || 10.3 || .385 || .440 || .500 || 2.3 || .9 || .5 || .3 || 3.0
|-
| style="text-align:left;"| 
| style="text-align:left;"| L.A. Clippers
| 62 || 2 || 11.4 || .441 || .432 || .545 || 1.6 || .6 || .3 || .1 || 3.7
|- class="sortbottom"
| style="text-align:center;" colspan="2" | Career
| 997 || 571 || 26.8 || .426 || .384 || .784 || 4.0 || 2.8 || .8 || .3 || 11.1

Playoffs

|-
| style="text-align:left;"| 2001
| style="text-align:left;"| Sacramento
| 8 || 0 || 17.6 || .435 || .571 || 1.000 || 3.5 || 1.4 || .4 || .1 || 7.5
|-
| style="text-align:left;"| 2002
| style="text-align:left;"| Sacramento
| 16 || 8 || 27.7 || .401 || .353 || .516 || 5.2 || 1.4 || .4 || .6 || 8.6
|-
| style="text-align:left;"| 2003
| style="text-align:left;"| Sacramento
| 10 || 5 || 17.4 || .360 || .286 || .722 || 2.9 || 1.4 || 1.2 || .5 || 5.3
|-
| style="text-align:left;"| 2004
| style="text-align:left;"| San Antonio
| 10 || 10 || 27.1 || .321 || .333 || .611 || 4.5 || 1.5 || .9 || .1 || 7.7
|-
| style="text-align:left;"| 2007
| style="text-align:left;"| Orlando
| 4 || 4 || 39.0 || .500 || .333 || .500 || 3.3 || 3.5 || 1.3 || 1.0 || 13.8
|-
| style="text-align:left;"| 2008
| style="text-align:left;"| Orlando
| 10 || 10 || 39.9 || .447 || .286 || .848 || 6.4 || 5.5 || .8 || .2 || 17.5
|-
| style="text-align:left;"| 2009
| style="text-align:left;"| Orlando
| 24 || 24 || 38.9 || .427 || .386 || .817 || 4.5 || 4.8 || .8 || .2 || 15.8
|-
| style="text-align:left;"| 2011
| style="text-align:left;"| Orlando
| 6 || 6 || 34.8 || .294 || .233 || .571 || 3.2 || 3.7 || 1.3 || .2 || 9.2
|-
| style="text-align:left;"| 2012
| style="text-align:left;"| Orlando
| 5 || 5 || 32.4 || .366 || .417 || .636 || 2.8 || 2.4 || 1.0 || .8 || 8.4
|-
| style="text-align:left;"| 2014
| style="text-align:left;"| L.A. Clippers
| 5 || 0 || 8.2 || .462 || .400 || .000 || 1.0 || .2 || .6 || .0 || 3.2
|- class="sortbottom"
| style="text-align:center;" colspan="2" | Career
| 98 || 72 || 29.9 || .406 || .350 || .751 || 4.2 || 2.9 || .8 || .3 || 10.7

Retirement and sports executive career
On November 13, 2015, Türkoğlu announced his retirement after 15 seasons playing in the NBA.

In a press conference held on November 16, 2015, President of the Turkish Basketball Federation Harun Erdenay announced the decision of the federation board that Türkoğlu was appointed CEO of the federation. His responsibilities cover the basketball leagues, national teams and sponsors.

Political career

On March 15, 2016, the Turkish press reported that President Recep Tayyip Erdoğan appointed Türkoğlu as one of his senior advisers.

Personal life
Türkoğlu was born on March 19, 1979, in the Gaziosmanpaşa district of Istanbul, Turkey. He is a Muslim.

Türkoğlu and his wife, Banu, welcomed their first daughter in February 2009. The couple's second daughter was born in April 2013.

See also
 
 List of European basketball players in the United States
 List of Turkish NBA players

References

External links

 NBA.com Profile 
 TBLStat.net Profile

1979 births
Living people
2002 FIBA World Championship players
2010 FIBA World Championship players
Anadolu Efes S.K. players
Basketball executives
Doping cases in basketball
Los Angeles Clippers players
National Basketball Association players from Turkey
Orlando Magic players
Phoenix Suns players
Sacramento Kings draft picks
Sacramento Kings players
San Antonio Spurs players
Small forwards
Basketball players from Istanbul
Toronto Raptors players
Turkish expatriate basketball people in the United States
Turkish Muslims
Turkish people of Bosniak descent
Turkish sports executives and administrators
Turkish sportspeople in doping cases
Turkish expatriate basketball people in Canada